Wisdom Airways was a regional airline operating in North-Western Thailand, with a base in Chiang Mai. On 1 October 2019, the airline ceased all operations permanently.

History 

The airline sought to take over the routes of Kan Air after it went out of business.  Although the airline employed the same pilots and operated the same routes as Kan Air, it denied any links to it. The airline began operations on 1 December 2017. 

On 1 October 2019, the airline announced on their official Facebook page that they would be suspending all operations until further notice.

Fleet 
The airline operated several Cessna 208 Caravan aircraft, including HS-WIA and HS-WIS.

It also had plans to acquire a larger aircraft, a DHC-6 Twin Otter.

Destinations 
On 25 June 2018, the airline began operating a route between Chiang Mai and Mae Hong Son.

References

External links

Defunct airlines of Thailand
Airlines established in 2017
Airlines disestablished in 2019
2019 disestablishments in Thailand
Airlines articles needing expert attention
Start-Class_airline_articles
Thai companies established in 2017